The Thoona Football Club was an Australian rules football club which competed in the numerous Associations and Leagues since 1885.

History

The club was based in the North Eastern town of Thoona, Victoria, Australia.

Thoona was first officially formed on 25 April 1885 at Warrington's Commercial Hotel in Thoona. 

Their first game was played against Benalla on 4 July 1885. 

The Club colours were first red and white vertical strips with a green sash before changing to a maroon with a blue sash.

Club Honourboard

Australian rules football clubs in Victoria (Australia)